Moorgate is a village to the north of Aylsham in the county of Norfolk, England.

Villages in Norfolk
Blickling